Post Occupancy Evaluation (POE) has its origins in Scotland and the United States and has been used in one form or another since the 1960s. Preiser and colleagues define POE as "the process of evaluating buildings in a systematic and rigorous manner after they have been built and occupied for some time". 

The unique aspect of Post Occupancy Evaluation is that it generates recommendations based on all stakeholder groups' experiences of subject buildings' effects on productivity and wellbeing.

Purposes of POE
Post Occupancy Evaluations is used to improve the ways that buildings are used to support productivity and wellbeing.

Specifically it is used to:
 Account for building quality
 Inform planning and briefing (programming) for new buildings and alterations
 Troubleshoot building/use problems (such as change management and new work styles)

The British Council for Offices (BCO) summarises that a POE provides feedback of how successful the workplace is in supporting the occupying organization and the requirements of individual end-users. The BCO also suggests that POE can be used to assess if a project brief has been met. Furthermore, the BCO recommends that POE is used as part of the Evidence-based design process, where the project usually refers to a building design fit-out or refurbishment, or to inform the project brief where the project is the introduction of a new initiative, system or process. POE usually involves feedback from the building occupants, through questionnaires, interviews and workshops, but may also involve more objective measures such as environmental monitoring, space measurement and cost analysis.

Building interest groups
Post Occupancy Evaluations involve all stakeholder groups with interests in the subject buildings. Stakeholders are typically:
 Employees - working in the buildings
 Clients, customers, students, prisoners, guests and patients - receiving services in the buildings
 Project sponsors, architects, engineers, builders - who produced the building
 Maintenance managers, tradespeople and cleaners - who maintain the building
 Future generations (represented by architects) - who will live in the environment polluted by the buildings' construction and operation

Components of POE
The POE process provides value-neutral prompts to stimulate stakeholders to make testable observations about their experiences of buildings' effect on productivity and wellbeing. These observations are clarified and documented by the evaluator. Stakeholders' testable observations will be specific to building design, use and operating conditions and these may involve "negotiation" of all three dimensions of building evaluation to realize the optimum ways of achieving productivity and wellbeing.

Recommendations are based on complete set of stakeholders' observations. Most recommendations are to inform planning and design of future new buildings the operational practices. They also generate some recommendations for modifications to the subject buildings and for changes in the ways that they are used. POE evaluators may recommend monitoring, research, investigation or project management studies.

Some POE include other building studies. POE incorporate may include quantitative and qualitative techniques. Most POEs will involve seeking feedback from the occupants of the place being evaluated; this may be achieved through various survey methodology including questionnaire, interview or focus group. The occupant feedback may be supplemented by environmental monitoring, such as temperature, noise levels, lighting levels and indoor air quality. More recently, POEs tend to include sustainable measures such as energy consumption, waste levels, and water usage. Other commonly used quantitative measures include space metrics, for example occupational density, space utilization and tenant efficiency ratio. Cost, either expressed as the cost of the project per square meter or the total cost of occupancy, is considered a key metric in building evaluation and may be compared with the occupant feedback to provide a better understanding of value.

Certification scheme
Both LEED and WELL consider occupant surveys as part of their certification scheme.

LEED v4 
IEQ survey, as a part of POE, is involved in LEED certification scheme v4. For all LEED O+M projects using LEED v4, one point (EQ Credit: Occupant Comfort Survey) can be awarded to those who intents to assess building occupants' comfort.

WELL v2 
WELL involves the occupant survey in both preconditions and optimization features in the concept of community. Besides, it has a particular feature related to occupant survey on thermal comfort concept.

Occupant Survey 
Occupant Survey (Feature C03) is one of the precondition features of the community concept, which means it is mandatory for certification. This feature intends to establish minimum standards for the evaluation of experience and self-reported health and well-being of building occupants. The requirements of this feature are the following two parts:

 Part 1: Select project survey. This can be either a third-party survey, or a custom survey;
 Part 2: Administer survey and report results.

Enhanced Occupant Survey 
Enhanced Occupant Survey (Feature C04) is an optimization feature of community concept, which helps to achieve WELL certification. The purpose of this feature is to evaluate comfort, satisfaction, behavior change, self-reported health and other robust factors related to the well-being of occupants in buildings. A project can have up to 3 points  it meets below requirements:

 Part 1: Select enhanced survey. This survey can be one of the pre-approved surveys in Feature C03 Part 1 with either additional one to three modules specific to WELL or additional  three to six project related topics (1 point);
 Part 2: Administer pre-occupancy survey and report results (1 point);
 Part 3: Monitor survey responses (1 point);
 Part 4: Facilitate interviews and focus groups (1 point).

Enhanced Thermal Performance 
Enhanced Thermal Performance (Feature T02) is one of the optimization features of thermal comfort concept. This feature aims to enhance thermal comfort and promote human productivity by ensuring that a substantial majority of building users (above 80%) perceive their environment as thermally acceptable. The maximum points are three, and there are achieved by following parts:

 Part 1:  Enhanced thermal environment. This is achieved by meeting specific standards (1 point);
 Part 2: Achieve thermal comfort. A post-occupancy survey should be administered at least twice a year to check whether regular occupants are satisfied with the thermal performance or not.

POE at any stage after building occupancy
The term "post occupancy" can be confusing and simply refers to an occupied building rather than a vacant one. Furthermore, POEs may be conducted at regular intervals to monitor how the building facilities and its operation are currently supporting the occupants. A pre-project POE may be used to:

 Document ways in which stakeholders experience buildings
 To inform the briefing and design process for proposed buildings and building alterations
 To negotiate and resolve new building features and qualities, which compromise productivity and well-being
 Measure a dimension of project success
 feedback and feed-forward
 Set a baseline for measurement
 Establish benchmark data
 Input to the change management programme and to align change management and design
 Highlight where future investments may be best placed, and best avoided

A POE is often carried out six to twelve months after construction work is complete and buildings are occupied. Post Occupancy Evaluations are also undertaken at any time buildings' "lives"; particularly to understand stakeholders' experience of them, for briefing alterations and changes.

Any built environment accommodating people
POE's have been conducted of facilities for schools, universities, technical institutes, kindergartens, museums, offices, courts, corrections, military, hospitals, landscape/civil works, learning environments, libraries, jails, police stations, housing, health centres and zoos. It would be equally possible to apply POE techniques to ships and "virtual" environments. POE has been applied to selected parts of buildings, aspects of buildings and groups of buildings on the same campus and several sites.

Independent evaluation
POE is usually carried out by architects or building professionals with a social science or workplace consulting background. POE by independent consultants can offer an impartial evaluation.

Other building studies
POE can be informed by reference to other building studies and POEs sometimes recommend other studies such as:
 Energy audit
 Survey (human research)
 Post Implementation Review
 Proprietary building rating schemes
 Noise measurements
 Indoor Air Quality measurements
 Benefits realisation management
 Building (maintenance) inspection
 Life-cycle assessment
 Valuation
 Environmental rating schemes (BREEAM, Green Star, LEED)

Relevant Organisations
POE has been developed and discussed within these organisations:
 International Association for People-Environment Studies
 Environment Design Research Association
Center for the Built Environment

References

External links 
 postoccupancyevaluation.com
Architecture